Germán Mariano Orozco (born 16 January 1976) is an Argentine field hockey defender, who made his debut for the Argentina men's national field hockey team in 1994. He competed for his native country in the 2000 Summer Olympics and the 2004 Summer Olympics.

He studied kinesiology at the University of Salvador in Buenos Aires. Aged six, he started to play hockey at the Banco Nacional de Desarrollo Club. Orozco played club hockey, as of 2005, in Germany, at a club in Hamburg, named UHC Hamburg. In January 2006 he moved to Dutch champions Oranje Zwart from Eindhoven.

In early 2018 he was chosen as Carlos Retegui's replacement after he resigned as coach of the Argentina men's national field hockey team.

References

External links

1976 births
Living people
Argentine male field hockey players
Male field hockey defenders
Olympic field hockey players of Argentina
Argentine field hockey coaches
Field hockey players from Buenos Aires
Field hockey players at the 2000 Summer Olympics
2002 Men's Hockey World Cup players
Field hockey players at the 2004 Summer Olympics
2006 Men's Hockey World Cup players
Pan American Games gold medalists for Argentina
Pan American Games medalists in field hockey
South American Games gold medalists for Argentina
South American Games medalists in field hockey
Uhlenhorster HC players
Oranje Zwart players
Expatriate field hockey players
Field hockey players at the 2003 Pan American Games
Competitors at the 2006 South American Games
Men's Hoofdklasse Hockey players
Argentine expatriate sportspeople in Germany
Argentine expatriate sportspeople in the Netherlands
Medalists at the 2003 Pan American Games
21st-century Argentine people